The Northamptonshire Regiment was a line infantry regiment of the British Army in existence from 1881 until 1960. In 1960, it was amalgamated with the Royal Lincolnshire Regiment to form the 2nd East Anglian Regiment (Duchess of Gloucester's Own Royal Lincolnshire and Northamptonshire), which was amalgamated with the 1st East Anglian Regiment (Royal Norfolk and Suffolk), the 3rd East Anglian Regiment (16th/44th Foot) and the Royal Leicestershire Regiment to form the present Royal Anglian Regiment.

History

Formation
The Northamptonshire Regiment was formed as part of the reorganisation of the infantry by the Childers Reforms when the 48th (Northamptonshire) Regiment of Foot (raised in 1741) and the 58th (Rutlandshire) Regiment of Foot (raised in 1755) were redesignated as the 1st and 2nd battalions of the Northamptonshire Regiment, with the regimental depot at Northampton. The regiment was initially based at Gibraltar Barracks in Northampton.

As well as the two regular battalions, the Northampton and Rutland Militia became the 3rd (Militia) Battalion, and the 1st Northamptonshire Rifle Volunteer Corps became the First Volunteer Battalion. With the enactment of the Territorial and Reserve Forces Act 1907, they became the 3rd (Special Reserve) and 4th (Territorial Force) battalions respectively.

In the years 1881–1914, the two regular battalions saw overseas service in Hong Kong, India, Singapore and South Africa, with the regiment receiving battle honours for actions in the North West Frontier Province and the Second Boer War. In 1908, the Volunteers and Militia were reorganised nationally, with the former becoming the Territorial Force and the latter the Special Reserve; the regiment now had one Reserve and two Territorial battalions.

First World War

Regular Army
The 1st Battalion landed at Le Havre as part of 2nd Brigade in the 1st Division in August 1914 for service on the Western Front.

The 2nd Battalion, which had been in Alexandria, returned to England and then landed at Le Havre as part of the 24th Brigade in the 8th Division in November 1914 also for service on the Western Front.

Territorial Force
The 1/4th Battalion landed at Suvla Bay as part of the 162nd Brigade in the 54th (East Anglian) Division in August 1915; it was evacuated from Gallipoli in December 1915 and arrived at Alexandria and then served in Egypt and Palestine later.

New Armies
The 5th (Service) Battalion (Pioneers) landed in France as pioneer troops to the 12th (Eastern) Division in May 1915 for service on the Western Front. The 6th (Service) Battalion landed in France as army troops to the 18th (Eastern) Division in July 1915 also for service on the Western Front. The 7th (Service) Battalion landed at Boulogne-sur-Mer as part of the 73rd Brigade in the 24th Division in September 1915 also for service on the Western Front.

Between the wars
Between the two world wars, the regular battalions spent long periods in India, the 1st Battalion arriving there in 1932 and the 2nd Battalion arriving there in 1919. On 17 October 1935, a Royal Scot Class locomotive of the London, Midland and Scottish Railway was named The Northamptonshire Regiment at a ceremony at Northampton (Castle) Station. After Gibraltar Barracks became too dilapidated, the regiment re-located to Quebec Barracks at Wootton in 1939.

Second World War

Regular Army battalions
The 1st Battalion was a Regular Army unit that served in the Burma campaign and India throughout the war with the 32nd Indian Infantry Brigade, 20th Indian Infantry Division.

The 2nd Battalion, Northamptonshire Regiment was also part of the Regular Army. Throughout the war, the battalion was assigned to the 17th Infantry Brigade, alongside the 2nd Royal Scots Fusiliers and 2nd Seaforth Highlanders, part of the 5th Infantry Division. The battalion saw active service as part of the British Expeditionary Force (BEF) in the battles of Belgium and France and had to be evacuated at Dunkirk. After being evacuated to England, the battalion spent two years on home defence, re-training and re-equipping. 2nd Battalion then joined the forces sent to invade Madagascar in May 1942 and then travelled to India and overland to Persia (now Iran) and Iraq in September of the same year. It travelled to Egypt and next fought in Sicily and Italy before being transferred to North-West Europe as part of 21st Army Group in February 1945.

Territorial Army battalions
The 4th Battalion was transferred to the Royal Engineers and converted, before the war, into the 50th (Northamptonshire Regiment) Anti-Aircraft Battalion, Royal Engineers. On the outbreak of war, it was serving with the 32nd (Midland) Anti-Aircraft Brigade, 2nd Anti-Aircraft Division. In August 1940, the battalion was transferred to the Royal Artillery and became 50th (Northamptonshire Regiment) Searchlight Regiment, Royal Artillery. Due to a severe shortage of manpower in the 21st Army Group fighting in North-west Europe, particularly in the infantry, the regiment was converted back into infantry, becoming 637th (Northamptonshire Regiment) Infantry Regiment, Royal Artillery and joined the 304th Infantry Brigade.

The 5th (Huntingdonshire) Battalion was assigned to the 143rd Infantry Brigade, part of the 48th (South Midland) Infantry Division. The 48th Division was sent to join the British Expeditionary Force in France in early 1940, the first Territorial division to be sent overseas in the Second World War, and the battalion was exchanged for the 1st Battalion, Oxford and Bucks Light Infantry and transferred to the 11th Infantry Brigade, 4th Infantry Division. It saw extensive service in France, Tunisia, Sicily and Italy before ending the war in Austria.

The 4th Battalion was reformed as a 2nd Line Territorial Army formation serving in the 183rd Infantry Brigade, as part of the 61st Infantry Division. It was raised in 1939, when the Territorial Army was doubled in size, as the duplicate of the 5th Battalion. Despite being raised for war service, it remained in the United Kingdom until February 1945 when, now as part of the 115th Infantry Brigade, it went to North West Europe.

Hostilities-only
The 50th (Holding) Battalion was raised on 12 June 1940. The role of the Holding battalion was to temporarily 'hold' men who were medically unfit, temporarily homeless, returning from abroad or awaiting orders. It was redesignated the 6th Battalion in October 1940 and was assigned to the 223rd Independent Infantry Brigade (Home). However, the battalion would remain in the United Kingdom throughout the war, later transferring to 204th Independent Infantry Brigade (Home) and becoming a reserve training battalion for the rest of the war.

Amalgamation
In 1948, the regiment was reduced to a single regular battalion. Following the recommendations of the 1957 Defence White Paper, the 1st Battalions of the Royal Lincolnshire and Northamptonshire Regiments were merged on 1 June 1960 to form the 2nd East Anglian Regiment (Duchess of Gloucester's Own Royal Lincolnshire and Northamptonshire). This regiment was short-lived, becoming part of the Royal Anglian Regiment on 1 September 1964.

Regimental museum
The Museum of the Northamptonshire Regiment is housed at Abington Park, Northampton.

Battalions 
The following is a list of the battalions which the regiment raised (f. Formed, c. Cadre, d. Disbanded, t. Transferred);

Badges and dress distinctions

The badges of the regiment included references to the units combined in 1881. The cap badge featured a representation of a castle and key and the battle honour "Gibraltar", earned by the 58th Foot in 1779–1783. Below the castle was a scroll bearing the honour "Talavera", and the badge was encircled by a laurel wreath earned by the 48th Foot in 1809 during the Peninsular War.

The collar badge (which was also used as the design for the regimental "crest"), was based on that of the Northamptonshire and Rutland Militia. This featured the cross of St George within a crowned circle. Around the circle was a laurel wreath, on the base of which was a horseshoe, representing Rutland.

The regimental buttons of other ranks bore the castle and key surmounted by a crown, while those worn on officers' mess dress displayed a scroll inscribed "Talavera" below a crown.

The facing colours of the 48th and 58th Foot were buff and black respectively. Although white facings were imposed in 1881 by the Childers reforms, the old colours were still used in the regiment. The regimental stable belt consisted of equal stripes of black, buff and sky blue. In 1927 the regiment's facings were changed to buff. The scarlet and blue officers' mess dress worn in the 1930s included collar and cuffs in the buff of the 48th and waistcoats in the black of the 58th. A black lanyard was worn on the battle-dress blouse introduced in 1937, and this was later adopted by the 2nd Battalion, Royal Anglian Regiment.

Battle honours
The regiment was awarded the following battle honours: 
Awarded for the actions of the 48th and 58th Regiments of Foot:
Louisburg, Quebec 1759, Martinique 1762, Havannah, Gibraltar 1779-'83 (Awarded as a badge consisting of a castle and key with the mooto Montis Insignia Calpe.), Martinique 1794 (awarded 1909), Maida, Egypt (Awarded as a badge of the sphinx superscribed "Egypt".) Douro, Talavera, Albuera, Badajoz, Salamanca, Vittoria, Pyrenees, Nivelle, Orthes, Toulouse, Peninsula, New Zealand, Sevastopol, South Africa 1879
Awarded for the actions of the Northamptonshire Regiment prior to 1914:
Tirah, Modder River, South Africa 1899-1902
Awarded for the actions in the First World War. Ten selected honours, shown in bold type, were displayed on the colours:
Mons, Retreat from Mons, Marne 1914, Aisne 1914, '18, Ypres 1914, '17, Langemarck 1914, '17, Gheluvelt, Nonne Boschen, Givenchy 1914, Neuve Chapelle, Aubers, Loos, Somme 1916, '18, Albert 1916, '18, Bazentin, Delville Wood, Pozieres, Flers-Coucelette, Morval, Thiepval, Le Transloy, Ancre Heights, Ancre 1916, '18, Bapaume 1917, '18, Arras 1917, '18, Vimy 1917, Scarpe 1917, '18, Arleux, Messines 1917, Pilckem, Passchendaele, Cambrai 1917, '18, St Quentin, Rosieres, Avre, Villers Bretonneux, Amiens, Drocourt-Queant, Hindenburg Line, Epehy, St Quentin Canal, Selle, Sambre, France and Flanders 1914-'18, Suvla, Landing at Suvla, Scimitar Hill, Gallipoli 1915, Egypt 1915-'17, Gaza, El Mughar, Nebi Samwil, Jerusalem, Jaffa, Tell' Asur, Megiddo, Sharon, Palestine 1917-'18
Awarded for the actions in the Second World War. Ten selected honours, shown in bold type, were displayed on the colours:
Defence of Escaut Defence of Arras Ypres-Comines Canal, North-West Europe 1940, '45, Djediada, Djebel Djaffa, Oued Zarga, Djebel Tanngoucha, Sidi Ahmed, North Africa 1942-'43, Landing in Sicily, Adrano, Sicily 1943, Sangro, Garigliano Crossing, Anzio, Cassino II, Monte Gabbione, Trasimene Line, Monte La Pieve, Argenta Gap, Italy 1943-'45, Madagascar, Yu, Imphal, Tamu Road, Bishenpur, Monywa 1945, Myinmu Bridgehead, Irrawaddy, Burma 1943-'45

Victoria Crosses
Sergeant William Ewart Boulter - First World War, 14 July 1916
Acting Captain Thomas Riversdale Colyer-Fergusson - First World War, 31 July 1917
Lieutenant Alan Richard Hill - First Boer War, 28 January 1881
Lance Corporal Leonard Allan Lewis - First World War, 18–21 September 1918
Private James Osborne - First Boer War, 22 February 1881
Captain Anketell Moutray Read - First World War, 25 September 1915

Colonel-in-Chief
1937–: Princess Alice, Duchess of Gloucester, GCB CI, GCVO, GBE

Regimental Colonels
Colonels of the regiment were:
1881–1897: (1st Battalion): Gen. William Anson McCleverty (ex 48th Foot)
1881–1892: (2nd Battalion): Gen. Sir Arthur Johnstone Lawrence, KCB (ex 58th Foot)
1897–1910: Maj-Gen. Robert Children Whitehead, CB
1910–1925: Maj-Gen. George Fitzherbert Browne, CB, DSO
1925–1931: Gen. Sir Havelock Hudson, GCB, KCIE
1931–1943: Gen. Sir Harry Hugh Sidney Knox, KCB, DSO
1943–1953: Maj-Gen. Guy St. George Robinson, CB, DSO, MC
1953–1956: Brig. Wilfrid John Jervois, MC
1956–1960: Brig. John Lingham, CB, DSO, MC
1960: Regiment amalgamated with the Royal Lincolnshire Regiment to form 2nd East Anglian Regiment (Duchess of Gloucester's Own Royal Lincolnshire and Northamptonshire).

References

Sources
 
 
J.B.M. Frederick, Lineage Book of British Land Forces 1660–1978, Two Volume Version, Wakefield, Microform Academic, 1984, .

Further reading

External links
The Northamptonshire Regiment in 1914-1918 (1914-1918.net)
The Northamptonshire Regiment (48th/58th Foot) (The Royal Anglian Regiment Museum)

Northamptonshire
Military units and formations established in 1881
Military units and formations disestablished in 1960
Military units and formations in Northamptonshire
Regiments of the British Army in World War II
Regiments of the British Army in World War I
1881 establishments in the United Kingdom
R